Artem Sergiyovich Pochtarev (born 24 July 1993) is a Ukrainian badminton player. His current partner for men's doubles is Gennadiy Natarov. Pochtarev competed in 2015 BWF World Championships, where he was defeated by Sho Sasaki in the first round.

Career achievements
Men's singles

Men's doubles with Gennadiy Natarov

Mixed doubles with Elena Prus

Notes
 International Challenge
 International Series

References

External links 
 
 

1993 births
Living people
People from Lysychansk
Ukrainian male badminton players
Badminton players at the 2016 Summer Olympics
Olympic badminton players of Ukraine
Badminton players at the 2015 European Games
Badminton players at the 2019 European Games
European Games competitors for Ukraine
Badminton players at the 2020 Summer Olympics
Sportspeople from Luhansk Oblast